Uria is a genus of seabirds in the auk family known in Britain as guillemots, in most of North America as murres, and in Newfoundland and Labrador as turr. These are medium-sized birds with mainly brown or black plumage in the breeding season. They breed on the coasts of the northern Atlantic and Pacific oceans.

Taxonomy
The genus Uria was introduced by the French zoologist Mathurin Jacques Brisson in 1760 with the common murre (Uria aalge) as the type species. The genus name is from Ancient Greek ouria, a waterbird  mentioned by Athenaeus. The English "guillemot" is from French guillemot probably derived from Guillaume, "William". "Murre" is of uncertain origins, but may imitate the call of the common guillemot.

Uria auks are relatives of the razorbill, little auk and the extinct great auk and together make up the tribe Alcini.  Despite the similar British common names, they are not so closely related to the  Cepphus guillemots, which form the tribe Cepphini.

Extant species
The genus contains two species:

Description
These birds breed in large colonies on coastal cliffs, laying single elongated conical eggs directly on cliff ledges. They move south in winter to keep in ice-free waters.

They dive for food from the surface, swimming underwater and being among the deepest divers of all birds, using their stubby wings to routinely dive to more than 100 meters, and feeding on fish and crustaceans, also some molluscs, insects and plant material.

Adult birds are black or brown on the head, neck, back and wings with white underparts. The bill is long and pointed.  They have a small rounded black tail. The lower face becomes white in winter.

The flight is strong and direct, and these species have fast wing beats due to the short wings.

Uria guillemots produces a variety of harsh cackling calls at the breeding colonies, but are silent at sea.

Fossils
Some prehistoric Uria species are also known:
 Uria bordkorbi Howard, 1981 (Monterey or Sisquoc, Late Miocene of Lompoc, USA)
 Uria affinis (Marsh, 1872) (Late Pleistocene of E USA) - possibly a subspecies of U. lomvia
 Uria paleohesperis Howard, 1982 (Late Miocene of W USA)
 Uria onoi Watanabe, Matsuoka and Hasegawa, 2016 (Middle-Late Pleistocene of Japan)

U. brodkorbi is interesting insofar as it is the only known occurrence of the Alcini tribe in the temperate to subtropical Pacific, except for the very fringe of the range of U. aalge. It suggests that the Uria species, which are the sister taxon to all the other Alcini, and like them are usually believed to have evolved in the Atlantic, may have evolved in the Caribbean or possibly close to the Isthmus of Panama. The modern Pacific distribution would then be part of a later arctic expansion, whereas most other auk lineages form clades with a continuous range in the Pacific, from arctic to subtropical waters.

References

External links
Hunting ‘Turr’ in Newfoundland’s Frigid Waters, New York Times, 4Dec. 2016 

 
Auks
Atlantic auks
Pacific auks
Guillemots
Bird genera